Chollas Creek is an urban creek in the city of San Diego that drains to the San Diego Bay. It is also the name of a populated area of City Heights, San Diego, California.

Chollas Creek arises in Lemon Grove and La Mesa, where its four branches begin. It empties into the Bay at Barrio Logan.

It has been described as "one of San Diego's most neglected watersheds." For decades the creek has been plagued by pollution, illegal dumping and the destruction of natural habitats. In 2002, the city of San Diego adopted a 20-year, $42 million plan to rehabilitate the creek. Regular cleanups to remove trash and encourage native plants are conducted by local groups such as the Friends of Chollas Creek and Groundwork San Diego.

In 2021, the city of San Diego decided to create the Chollas Creek Regional Park along many of the undeveloped parts of the creek's branches, to make better use of these areas and to remedy a long-standing lack of parks in southeastern San Diego.

References

Rivers of San Diego County, California
San Diego Bay watershed
Landforms of San Diego County, California
La Mesa, California
Rivers of Southern California